Inge Senoner (21 February 1940 – 22 July 2007) was an Italian alpine skier. She competed in two events at the 1964 Winter Olympics. She is the sister of the skier Carlo Senoner.

References

External links
 

1940 births
2007 deaths
Italian female alpine skiers
Olympic alpine skiers of Italy
Alpine skiers at the 1964 Winter Olympics
People from Santa Cristina Gherdëina
Sportspeople from Südtirol